This is a list of 107 species in Rogas, a genus of braconid wasps in the family Braconidae.

Rogas species

 Rogas abraxas Bano, 2001 c g
 Rogas aequalis (Szepligeti, 1914) c g
 Rogas annulifemur (Enderlein, 1920) c g
 Rogas areatus (Enderlein, 1920) c g
 Rogas areolatus (Szepligeti, 1914) c g
 Rogas ashmeadi Watanabe, 1957 c g
 Rogas asmaranus (Enderlein, 1920) c g
 Rogas atripes (Szepligeti, 1914) c g
 Rogas baguioensis Shenefelt, 1975 c g
 Rogas banksi (Baker, 1917) c g
 Rogas benguetensis (Baker, 1917) c g
 Rogas bevisi (Brues, 1926) c
 Rogas bicolor (Schrottky, 1915) c g
 Rogas bicoloratus (Enderlein, 1920) c g
 Rogas breviventris (Enderlein, 1912) c g
 Rogas brownii (Baker, 1917) c g
 Rogas capensis (Cameron, 1905) c g
 Rogas cerurae (Ashmead, 1889) c g
 Rogas ceylonicus (Enderlein, 1912) c
 Rogas citernii (Mantero, 1904) c g
 Rogas coloratus Motschoulsky, 1863 c g
 Rogas crassipalpus (Enderlein, 1912) c g
 Rogas desertus (Telenga, 1941) c
 Rogas ecuadoriensis (Brues, 1926) c g
 Rogas elongatus (Szepligeti, 1914) c g
 Rogas erythroderus (Spinola, 1851) c g
 Rogas eupoeyiae (Ashmead, 1897) c g
 Rogas fascipennis (Cresson, 1869) c g
 Rogas festivus (Statz, 1938) c g
 Rogas flavomarginatus (Szepligeti, 1914) c g
 Rogas flavus (Baker, 1917) c g
 Rogas fritschii (Brues, 1933) c g
 Rogas fulvinervis (Cameron, 1911) c g
 Rogas fusciceps (Cresson, 1869) c g
 Rogas fuscovarius (Cresson, 1865) c g
 Rogas grandimaculatus (Cameron, 1910) c g
 Rogas hova (Granger, 1949) c
 Rogas iliganensis Shenefelt, 1975 c g
 Rogas inaequalis (Szepligeti, 1914) c g
 Rogas indianensis Muesebeck & Walkley, 1951 c g
 Rogas indicus (Cameron, 1910) c
 Rogas insignicornis (Granger, 1949) c g
 Rogas insignis (Brues, 1926) c g
 Rogas kanpurensis (Pant, 1960) c g
 Rogas lateralis (Cameron, 1905) c g
 Rogas longicollis (Baker, 1917) c g
 Rogas luteus Nees, 1834 c g
 Rogas luzonensis (Baker, 1917) c g
 Rogas maculicornis (Brues, 1926) c g
 Rogas melanocephalus (Cameron, 1887) c
 Rogas melanocerus (Cameron, 1906) c g
 Rogas melanosoma (Ashmead, 1905) c g
 Rogas melanospilus (Cameron, 1911) c
 Rogas melleus (Cresson, 1896) c g
 Rogas meridianus (Szepligeti, 1914) c g
 Rogas mimeuri (Ferriere, 1925) c g
 Rogas mimicus (Baker, 1917) c g
 Rogas modestus (Baker, 1917) c g
 Rogas nigricans Chen & He, 1997 c g
 Rogas nigricarpus (Szepligeti, 1907) c
 Rogas nigriceps (Brèthes, 1909) c g
 Rogas nigridorsum Belokobylskij, 1996 c g
 Rogas nigristigma Chen & He, 1997 c g
 Rogas nigronotatus (Szepligeti, 1914) c g
 Rogas nigroornatus (Szepligeti, 1914) c g
 Rogas nigrovenosus (Vojnovskaja-Krieger, 1935) c g
 Rogas orientalis (Szepligeti, 1914) c g
 Rogas ornatus (Cresson, 1869) c g
 Rogas oyeyamensis (Watanabe, 1937) c g
 Rogas palavanicus (Baker, 1917) c g
 Rogas pallidipalpis (Cameron, 1911) c g
 Rogas pictipennis (Brues, 1924) c
 Rogas pilosus (Cameron, 1910) c g
 Rogas plecopterae (Chatterjee, 1943) c g
 Rogas praeustus (Fahringer, 1941) c g
 Rogas punctipleuris (Szepligeti, 1914) c g
 Rogas pygmaeus (Enderlein, 1920) c
 Rogas roonensis (Cameron, 1910) c g
 Rogas roxanus (Telenga, 1941) c g
 Rogas rufifemur (Szepligeti, 1914) c g
 Rogas ruspolii (Mantero, 1904) c g
 Rogas sanchezi (Baker, 1917) c g
 Rogas saturatus (Brues, 1926) c g
 Rogas scioensis (Mantero, 1904) c g
 Rogas semiluteus (Szepligeti, 1911) c
 Rogas semirufus (Szepligeti, 1911) c g
 Rogas separatus (Baker, 1917) c g
 Rogas siccitesta (Morley, 1937) c g
 Rogas signaticornis (Enderlein, 1920) c g
 Rogas signativena (Enderlein, 1920) c g
 Rogas somaliensis (Szepligeti, 1914) c
 Rogas speciosicornis (Granger, 1949) c
 Rogas steinbachi Mathur, 1957 c g
 Rogas striatifrons (Cameron, 1911) c g
 Rogas subquadratus (Baker, 1917) c g
 Rogas surrogatus (Schulz, 1907) c g
 Rogas tertiarius (Brues, 1906) c g
 Rogas testaceicollis (Cameron, 1910) c g
 Rogas transvaalensis (Cameron, 1911) c
 Rogas tricolor (Enderlein, 1912) c g
 Rogas unicarinatus (Holmgren, 1868) c g
 Rogas varicarinatus (Cameron, 1911) c g
 Rogas varinervis (Cameron, 1911) c g
 Rogas ventrimacula (Enderlein, 1920) c g
 Rogas vestitor (Say, 1936) c g
 Rogas vollenhoveni Gribodo, 1881 c g
 Rogas yanagiharai (Sonan, 1940) c

This is a list of 107 species in Rogas, a genus of braconid wasps in the family Braconidae.
Data sources: i = ITIS, c = Catalogue of Life, g = GBIF, b = Bugguide.net

References

Rogas